Allan Anderson (born 22 April 1949) is an Australian cricketer. He played three first-class matches for New South Wales between 1971/72 and 1972/73.

See also
 List of New South Wales representative cricketers

References

External links
 

1949 births
Living people
Australian cricketers
New South Wales cricketers
Cricketers from Sydney